"Without Love" is a song from the 2002 musical Hairspray. It is a quartet song performed by Tracy, Link, Penny, and Seaweed, and is inspired by the duets of Motown artists Marvin Gaye & Tammi Terrell.

Synopsis

Taking place during the second act of the musical and the 2007 musical film, "Without Love" finds the four teenagers singing about how they have all broken down societal barriers in order to love one another, and the two boys free the girls from their entrapment, heading off to the Corny Collins Show TV studio.

Answers.com explains: "In this song, the male lead, Link, reveals his love to Tracy, and Tracy's white friend, Penny, expresses her love for a black teen named Seaweed. The couples must literally fight through physical barriers in order to get to each other and rejoin the protest."

Analysis
Answers.com explains the lyrical prowess of the song:

Critical reception
CinemaBlend writes in a movie review that "we’ve lost some of the original picture's romance to the PG rating, so songs like “Without Love” don’t work as well". The New York Times named the song has "one of the film’s musical high points", explaining that "the two young couples express their yearning with the help of some ingenious and amusing special effects". The Washington Post said "Marc Shaiman's music is virtually wall-to-wall bliss, and some of the lyrics, written with Scott Wittman, particularly in the romantic quartet "Without Love", remain surprising and clever no matter how many times you've listened to them." RecordOnline deemed it an "affirmative anthem", while The Column named it an "energetic and comic number". The Daily Texan described it as "perhaps one of the musical’s most iconic songs".

References

Songs from Hairspray (musical)
2002 songs
Songs written by Scott Wittman
Songs written by Marc Shaiman